Lamponia is a genus of skippers in the family Hesperiidae.

Species
Recognised species in the genus Lamponia include:
 Lamponia lamponia (Hewitson, 1876)
 Lamponia ploetzii (Capronnier, 1874)

References

Natural History Museum Lepidoptera genus database

Hesperiinae
Hesperiidae genera